"Still Breathing" is a song by American rock band Green Day. It was released on November 12, 2016, as the second single from their twelfth studio album, Revolution Radio (2016). It is considered to be an emotionally dark song that explores the theme of individuals finding strength in the face of hardship and tough times. The song's music videoreleased on November 7, 2016reflected upon that theme.

"Still Breathing" received positive critical reception and was praised for its sentimental concept and spirited musical composition. It peaked at number one on the US Alternative Songs, Mainstream Rock, Rock Airplay, and Canada Rock charts, and appeared on various other international charts.

Background and composition
In 2014following the band's 99 Revolutions Tour, in support of ¡Uno! ¡Dos! and ¡Tré! (2012)Billie Joe Armstrong started testing and recording material at his new studio, Otis, in Oakland, California. The first song that Armstrong wrote was "Bang Bang", the first single released from their 2016 album Revolution Radio. That song reminded critics of Green Day's earlier work.

Following that, "Still Breathing" was released as the second single from the album and was also compared to the band's earlier works. The new song was described as dark and unsettling, with a theme of staying strong in the face of adversity and overcoming it. The song explores the lives of individuals addicted to drugs and gambling, fatherless children, single mothers, and soldiers returning from war, with their stories intertwined throughout the song.

Considered to be more emotional than the lead single, "Still Breathing" is characterized as a "serious" track. Armstrong intended to make others happy, and to make a difference, by getting people to recognize themselves in the song. He described the track as "a very heavy song", and further explained, "Sometimes I run away from being too heavy. But sometimes it just comes out that way." While commenting on the chorus, I'm still breathing on my own, he added, "at some point, we're all going to have to be on life support. As time goes on, your thoughts get darker."

The song samples the melody for the verses from The Struts' "Could Have Been Me" and their members are credited as co-writers.

According to Olivia Waring at Metro, the band has "moved away from their punk roots" with the song. Nonetheless, the song is described as punk rock by NME and Entertainment Weekly. Anna Gaca of Spin characterized it as a "paint-by-numbers pop-punk song." Josiah Hughes from Exclaim! likewise describes the song as pop-punk. On the other hand, BrooklynVegan writer Andrew Sacher feels the song is "more of an anthemic alternative rock song than the snotty pop punk they helped bring to prominence in the '90s."

Release

Following the release of "Bang Bang" on August 11, 2016, a lyric video for "Still Breathing" was uploaded to YouTube on September 22, 2016. It was released as the second single from Revolution Radio on November 12, 2016, and a promotional CD was made available only in the UK on February 10, 2017.

Reception
"Still Breathing" was received positively by music critics. Writing for Entertainment Weekly, Kevin O'Donnell praised the song by saying that it "isn't just one of their most rousing songs, it's also one of their best." Gil Kaufman of Billboard stated the band is "back in classic form" with emotional twists and deep lyrical content that symbolize some of band's "most beloved work". NME called it "an air-punching punk glory full of strength, power and guts" that "lauds the resilience of the human spirit and the ability to make it through tough times".

The A.V. Club described "Still Breathing" as a "statement of purpose for the record" and that it was a recognition of everyone's struggle. Loudwire's Graham Hartmann noted it as the "poppiest cut from the album yet, while also being the most emotionally heavy", opining that the band had shifted to a more "radio-friendly" version of their "revolution" while keeping their same aesthetic. PopMatters wrote that the song "is overly familiar" and that it had "quiet verses and a loud chorus", but admired the melody and chord progression of the song.

Chart performance
"Still Breathing" peaked at number one on the US Alternative Songs, Mainstream Rock, and Rock Airplay charts. It became their 11th number one on the US Alternative Songs chart, surpassing Foo Fighters and tying with Linkin Park for the second most number one positionsbehind only the Red Hot Chili Peppers with 13. The song became their fifth number one on the US Mainstream Rock chart, and along with "Bang Bang", this become the first time since American Idiot (2004) that two of their singles from the same album reached the number one spot on the US Alternative Songs and Mainstream Rock charts.

The song became Green Day's fourth number one on the US Rock Airplay chart, the second-most number ones of any band, behind only Foo Fighters with five. While "Know Your Enemy" (2009) and "Bang Bang" have topped the three chartsUS Alternative Songs, Mainstream Rock, and Rock Airplay chartsthis was the first time that a single of theirs had reached the number one position on those three charts simultaneously.

"Still Breathing" reached number 11 and 17 on the US Hot Rock Songs and Adult Alternative Songs, respectively. The song peaked at number one on the Canada Rock, and number two on the UK Rock charts. The song also charted in Belgium (Ultratip Flanders), Czech Republic (Rádio Top 100 Oficiální), and Slovakia (Rádio Top 100 Oficiální).

Track listing

Charts

Weekly charts

Year-end charts

Music video
The official music video was directed by P. R. Brown, and released on November 7, 2016. The video reflects the song's central theme of being in unsettled situations and getting through them. In the beginning of the video, Armstrong is shown as a solitary figure; his bandmates Mike Dirnt and Tre Cool are sitting lethargically in a different location. The video explores situations of various other characters as well, all starting out in a dejected state. The shots of Armstrong, Dirnt, and Cool are repeatedly seen interspersed with developments in the lives of the other characters. Eventually, all of them manage to find things that make them happy. As the video reaches its end, Armstrong is seen entering a warehouse and being happily reunited with his bandmates, who had begun to play their instruments without him there.

References

External links

Green Day songs
2016 singles
2016 songs
Songs written by Billie Joe Armstrong
Songs written by Mike Dirnt
Songs written by Tré Cool
Songs written by Rick Parkhouse
Songs written by George Tizzard